Alyne Gauthier-Charlebois (1908-1955) was a Canadian artist. 

Her work is included in the collections of the National Gallery of Canada and the Musée national des beaux-arts du Québec.

References

20th-century Canadian women artists
1908 births
1955 deaths
20th-century Canadian artists